Bionychiurus tamilensis is a species of the family Onychiuridae, a group of springtails. Bionychiurus tamilensis has a dorsal pseudocellus (pso) formula as 32/133/33343 and a ventral pso formula as 11/011/11121. It was recorded from the Nilgiri Hills, Nilgiri Biosphere Reserve of Western Ghats, India. The status as new species of the genus Bionychiurus was confirmed molecular studies.

References

Collembola
Animals described in 2021